Caloreas augustella is a moth in the family Choreutidae. It was described by Clarke in 1933. It is found in North America, where it has been recorded from Washington.

References

 Natural History Museum Lepidoptera generic names catalog

Choreutidae
Moths described in 1933